The St. Leger Italiano is a Group 3 flat horse race in Italy open to thoroughbreds aged three years or older. It is run at Milan over a distance of 2,800 metres (about 1¾ miles), and it is scheduled to take place each year in October.

It is Italy's equivalent of the St. Leger Stakes, a famous race in England.

History
St. Leger Italiano was established in the late 19th century, and it was originally restricted to three-year-olds.

The first winner to complete a Triple Crown (having previously won the Premio Parioli and the Derby Italiano) was Niccolo dell'Arca in 1941. The feat was subsequently achieved by Gladiolo in 1946 and Botticelli in 1954.

The present system of race grading was introduced in the early 1970s, and for a period St. Leger Italiano held Group 2 status. It was relegated to Group 3 level in 1988, and from this point, it was contested over 2,900 metres at Turin. For several years it was held in July.

The race was opened to older horses and rescheduled for the autumn in 1994. It was later downgraded to Listed level, and it began its current spell in Milan in 2002. It regained Group 3 status in 2010.

Records
Most successful horse (3 wins):
 Noel – 1999, 2000, 2001

Leading jockey since 1988 (3 wins):
 Mirco Demuro – Maktub (2002), N'Oubliez Jamais (2006), Spanish Hidalgo (2007)

Leading trainer since 1988 (4 wins):
 Hans Blume – Noel (1999, 2000, 2001), N'Oubliez Jamais (2006)

Winners since 1988

 The 2008 running was cancelled because of a strike.
 The 2021 races took place at Capannelle.

Earlier winners
 1892: Dardinello
 1893: Festuca
 1894: Sansonetto
 1895: Oranzeb
 1896: Goldoni
 1897: Hira
 1898: Brunello
 1899: Elena
 1900: Kikamba
 1901: Silvana
 1902: Euro
 1903: Esquilino
 1904: Eureka
 1905: Onorio
 1906: Plinio
 1907: San Gallo
 1908: Qui Vive
 1909: Dedalo
 1910: Wistaria
 1911: Alcimedonte
 1912: Valmy
 1913: Arianna
 1914: Prometeo
 1915: Aristippo
 1916: Kibwesi
 1917: Alcione
 1918: Burne Jones
 1919: Delft
 1920: Vodice
 1921: Michelangelo
 1922: Fiorello
 1923: Giovanna Dupre

 1924: Manistee
 1925: Major
 1926: Cranach
 1927: Delfino
 1928: Akenaton
 1929: Ortello
 1930: Ostiglia
 1931: Ageratum
 1932: Fenolo
 1933: Crapom
 1934: Grand Marnier
 1935: Lub
 1936: Tellurio
 1937: El Greco
 1938: Ursone
 1939: Lafcadio
 1940: Bellini
 1941: Niccolo dell'Arca
 1942: Scire
 1943: Tokamura
 1944: Macherio
 1945: Peana
 1946: Gladiolo
 1947: Tenerani
 1948: Trevisana
 1949: Antonio Canale
 1950: Tommaso Guidi
 1951: Daumier
 1952: Belfagor
 1953: De Dreux
 1954: Botticelli
 1955: Derain

 1956: Barbara Sirani
 1957: Braque
 1958: Tiepolo
 1959: Feria
 1960: Tiziano
 1961: Proteo
 1962: Bragozzo
 1963: Tavernier
 1964: Crivelli
 1965: Ben Marshall
 1966: Chio
 1967: Carlos Primero
 1968: Baccio Bandinelli
 1969: Bacuco
 1970: Alcamo
 1971: Weimar
 1972: Tierceron
 1973: Veio
 1974: Mister Henry
 1975: Laomedonte
 1976: Gallio
 1977: Novigrad
 1978: Xibury
 1979: Quadrupler
 1980: Lotar
 1981: Solero
 1982: Crusader Castle
 1983: Celio Rufo
 1984: Rough Pearl
 1985: Fire of Life
 1986: Comme l'Etoile
 1987: Sergeyevich

See also
 List of Italian flat horse races

References
 Racing Post / irishracing.com / siegerlisten.com:
 1999, 2000, 2001, 2002, 

 galopp-sieger.de – St. Leger Italiano.
 horseracingintfed.com – International Federation of Horseracing Authorities – St. Leger Italiano (2017).
 pedigreequery.com – St. Leger Italiano – Milano San Siro.

Horse races in Italy
Open long distance horse races
Sport in Milan